The 2010 season was Jeju United FC's twenty-eighth season in the K-League in South Korea. Jeju United FC is competing in K-League, League Cup and Korean FA Cup.

Current squad

K-League

Championship

Korean FA Cup

League Cup

Group stage

Knockout stage

Squad statistics

Appearances and goals
Statistics accurate as of match played 5 December 2010

Top scorers

Discipline

Transfer

In

Out

References

 Jeju United FC website

Jeju United
2010